Guimarei is a former civil parish in the municipality of Santo Tirso, Portugal. In 2013, the parish merged into the new parish Lamelas e Guimarei. It has a population of 736 (2001 census), and an area of 6.43 km2. It is located 3 km south of the center of the city of Santo Tirso in the Leça Valley.

It is a residential place with some people working in agriculture.

References

Former parishes of Santo Tirso